Hlíðarfjall is a mountain located west of the Icelandic town Akureyri in Eyjafjörður. The former hotel no longer offers accommodation and is now mostly used for meetings.

Hlíðarfjall is generally considered to be named after Lögmannshlíð, a (formerly important) homestead and church site on the slopes of the mountain (the word hlíð having the meaning "slope").

References

Mountains of Iceland
Ski areas and resorts in Iceland
One-thousanders of Iceland